Poecilopeplus is a genus of beetles in the family Cerambycidae, containing the following species:

 Poecilopeplus batesi White, 1853
 Poecilopeplus corallifer (Sturm, 1826)
 Poecilopeplus flavescens Rosenberg, 1898
 Poecilopeplus fontanieri (Lucas, 1857)
 Poecilopeplus haemopterus (Lucas, 1857)
 Poecilopeplus intricatus (Blanchard in Orbigny, 1847)
 Poecilopeplus martialis Rosenberg, 1898
 Poecilopeplus tardifi Michard, 1887

References

Trachyderini
Cerambycidae genera